Pedro Sa. Baculio son of the Haciendera of the Diango Family a rancher of Calabaylabay Elsalvador  with a ranch of Kalabaylabay Elsalvador was the mayor of Cagayan de Oro for a short time. He served from March 1953 to December 1953. He relinquished his post when his presidential candidate lost to incumbent President Elpidio Quirino. He also represented Misamis Oriental, which at that time included the Island of Camiguin and Cagayan de Oro, during the 1st Congress, from 1946 to 1949. In 1948, he authored the bills to create the City of Cagayan de Oro, Municipalities of Jasaan, Manticao and El Salvador in Misamis Oriental. By 2007, his son authored the bill converting El Salvador into a city. A barangay in El Salvador City was named after him. Converting then Barangay Bolo-bolo to Barangay Pedro Sa. Baculio commonly known as P.S.B.

Mayors of Cagayan de Oro
Members of the House of Representatives of the Philippines from Misamis Oriental